Max Eastley (born 1 December 1944, Torquay, Devon, England) is a British visual and sound artist. He is part of the Cape Farewell Climate Change project. He studied painting and graphic art at Newton Abbot Art School and then went on to gain a BA in Fine Art (1969–1972) at Middlesex University (formerly Hornsey School of Art). He is a sculptor (kinetic), musician and composer. His primary instrument is a unique electro-acoustic monochord, developed from an aeolian sculpture. 'The Arc' consists of a single string stretched lengthwise across a long piece of wood (around ten feet) which can be played with a bow, fingers or short glass rods. The end of the instrument has a microphone attached so the basic sound can be amplified, recorded and run through sound effect programs.

Eastley has collaborated with many different artists and musicians on performances, installations and recordings including: David Toop,  Brian Eno, Paul Burwell, Victor Gama, Hugh Davies, Steve Beresford, Peter Greenaway, Dave Hunt, David Buckland, Evan Parker, Peter Cusack, Spaceheads. From 2001–2002, Eastley was a visiting fellow at John Moores University Liverpool and is currently (2010 onwards) an AHRC research fellow at Oxford Brookes University researching Aeolian phenomena. On 17 May 1989, Eastley was awarded a prize in the 'Learning Spaces Category' of the working in the City European Communities Architectural Ideas Competition (University College Dublin).

Selected discography
Eastley has worked across a variety of genres including: improvised and experimental music; folk music; popular song; jazz; compositions using environmental recordings as well as musical resources. He has also composed music for film and dance. Eastley was part of the group 'The 49 Americans', who played together for a period during the 1980s and produced several albums together.

'New and Rediscovered Musical Instruments' with David Toop, produced by Brian Eno (Obscure) – 1975
'Circadian Rhythm' with Paul Burwell, Hugh Davies, Paul Lovens, Paul Lytton, Annabel Nicolson, Evan Parker and David Toop (Incus Records) – 1978
'Whirled Music' with Steve Beresford, Paul Burwell and David Toop (Quartz) – 1980
'My Heart's in Motion' (Nato) – 1985
'At Close Quarters' Various artists (These Records) – 1993
'Buried Dreams' with David Toop (Beyond) – 1994
'Isolationism' Various artists (Virgin) – 1994
'Day for Night' with Peter Cusack – 2001
'The Time of the Ancient Astronaut' with the Spaceheads (Bip Hop) – 2001
'Doll Creature' with David Toop (Bip Hop) – 2004
'Hydrophony for Dagon' with Michael Prime (Absurd) – 2006
'Songs of Transformation' with Martyn Bates (Musica Maxima Magnetica) – 2007
'ARCTIC' produced by David Buckland/Cape Farewell – 2007
'A Very Long Way from Anywhere Else' with the Spaceheads (Bip Hop) – 2007
'A Life Saved by a Spider and Two Doves' with Graham Halliwell, Evan Parker and Mark Wastell (Another Timbre) – 2008
'Dark Architecture' (Another Timbre) – 2009
'Max Eastley Installation Recordings 1973–2008'

Selected performances
Eastley has performed as a solo musician and in many combinations with other artists. He has worked on stage with his installations and with film and has created and performed in musical/theatrical performances such as: 'Whirled Music'.

Ars Electronica, 1990 – Performance of Whirled Music
Xebec Hall, 1993 – Duo played with David Toop using invented experimental instruments
Purcell Room, South Bank, 1995 – Duo with David Toop
Museum of Modern Art, Berne, Switzerland, 1996 – Duo with David Toop
Impakt Festival, Utrecht, Holland, 1996 – Solo performance
ICA London, 1997 – Quartet with Thomas Koner, Peter Cusack and Alquima
Lanzarote Music and Visual Art Festival, 1998 – Trio with David Toop and Pete Lockett
Volksbühne Theatre, Berlin, 1999 – Duo with Thomas Koner
Mimi Festival, Marseille, 2002 – Performance with The Spaceheads
Xtract Sculpture Musicale, Podewil, Berlin, 2003 – Duo with David Toop
Paradiso Amsterdam, 2003 – Solo performance
ICA London, 2003 – Duo with Victor Gama
Atlantic Waves, 2006  – Quartet with Thomas Koner, Asmus Tietchens and Victor Gama at The Barbican
ARCTIC at the Hamburg Planetarium, 2007 – Film installation by David Buckland, music by Max Eastley
'Sprawl', Various locations, 2007 – Tour with Thomas Koner playing Amsterdam, London, Bristol and Berlin
Signal Festival, Sardinia, 2007 – Solo performance
Millennium Park Chicago, 2007 – Solo performance by Max (for Cape Farewell) with film by David Buckland
Fete Quaqua Festival of Improvised Music, The Vortex, London, 2008 – Improvised performance with various artists
Le Weekend Sterlings No Limit Music Festival, 2008 – Quartet with Marc Wastell, Graham Halliwell, Evan Parker
Rays Jazz, London, 2008 – Trio with Nancy Ruffer and Lol Coxhill
Late at the Tate, Tate Britain, London, 2009 – Performance for Cape Farewell with Robyn Hitchcock, K.T. Tunstall and Shlomo
Nuemusic Und Kunste Festival, Darmstadt, Germany, 2009 – Trio with Volker Staub and Michael Weilacher
Nobel Laureate Symposium, Science Museum, London, 2009 – Solo performance
Pestival Festival, Queen Elizabeth Hall, South Bank, London, 2009 – With Robyn Hitchcock and various artists
Cape Farewell at Rome Film Festival, 2009 – Duo with Jarvis Cocker
The Spinning Top at The Barbican, London, 2009 – Performance with Graham Coxon, Martin Carthy, Robyn Hitchcock and Natasha Marsh

Selected installations and exhibitions
Eastley has done a wide variety of installations worldwide, many of which use moving parts (motors, pulleys etc.) to create ambient soundscapes while engaging the observer visually. Many recordings of the below installations appear on the CD: 'Max Eastley Installation Recordings 1973–2008' 
Serpentine Gallery, 1976
Ikon Gallery, Birmingham 1979
Arnolfini gallery, Bristol 1980
Apollo House, Eindhoven, Holland 1980
A Noise in Your Eye (touring exhibition), Arnolfini gallery, the Barbican 1986
Artec Biennale, Ngoya, Japan 1993
Ireland and Europe Sculpture Event, Iveagh Gardens, Dublin 1997
Sculpture in Woodland, County Wicklow, Ireland 1999
The Big Chill Festival, 2000
ICC Centre, Japan 2000
Festival de Arte Sonoro, Mexico 2002
Interior Landscape, Reading Hindu Temple and Community Association 2003
European Capital of Culture, Cork, Ireland
Kinetic Drawings, Metropole Gallery, Folkestone UK, 2008

Installations for Cape Farewell
Eastley collaborated with sound engineer Dave Hunt to develop an innovative computer-controlled amplification system for these installations. Eastley has been part of the Cape Farewell project since 2005 and has been on three trips to Spitsbergen with the organisation. Sound clip of bearded seals
Ice Garden (Cape Farewell Climate Change), Oxford 2005
Eden Project, 2009

The following installations were part of a touring exhibition:
Natural History Museum, London, 2006
Liverpool Biennial, 2006
Kampnagel Cultural Centre, Hamburg, 2007
Madrid, 2008

Publications featured in
Eastley has appeared in several publications since the 1970s, including:
'Sonourgy', published by Exeter College of Art 1974
'New and Rediscovered Musical Instruments', published by Quartz 1975
'Echo: The Images of Sound', published by Het Apollohuis 1987
'Grove's Dictionary of Music',
'Experimental Musical Instruments Vol. V #2' 1989
'Bijutsu Techo' No.678 Vol.45, 1994
'Site of Sound', published by Errant Bodies 1999
'ICC Catalogue Magazine', Tokyo, 28 January 2000 Issue
'Leonardo Music Journal' 2001
'Burning Ice' (Cape Farewell catalogue) 2006
'The Fundamentals of Sonic Art and Sound Design', published by AVA Academia 2007
'Klangräume der Kunst', 2010
'The Wire Magazine', Issue No. 265 March 2006, Issue No. 291 May 2008

Film, radio and dance

Film
'Water Wrackets', film by Peter Greenaway, music by Max Eastley – 1978
'Clocks of the Midnight Hours', the work of Max Eastley directed by Simon Reynell, Channel 4 TV/Arts Council Great Britain – 1989
'Art from a Changing Arctic', Produced by Cape Farewell, directed by David Hinton – 2005
'Kinetic Drawings', Film by Helen Petts of the exhibition at the Metropole Gallery, Folkestone – 2008
'Piper of Invisible Fires', Film by Helen Petts and Max Eastley at Dilston Grove, London – 2010

Radio
Jarvis Cocker's Sunday Service, Interview on Radio 6 – 2010
Late Junction on BBC Radio 3, Fiona Talkington featuring Max Eastley's installations, Late Junction on Radio 3 – 2010
Various programs on Resonance FM

Dance
Eastley composed music for the Siobhan Davies Production: 'Plants and Ghosts' in 2002.

References

Reviews
Review on the BBC of 'Doll Creature'
Review on Intuitive Music website of 'Doll Creature'
Review on Boomkat of 'A Very Long Way From Anywhere Else'
Description and reviews on Discogs of 'Time of the Ancient Astronaut'
Various reviews of 'A Life Saved By A Spider And Two Doves', with Graham Halliwell, Evan Parker and Mark Wastell on Another Timbre website
Various reviews of 'Dark Architecture' with Rhodri Davies on Another Timbre website
Description and review of Max Eastley's installation recordings on the Paradigm Discs website

External links
Max Eastley Max Eastley's Discogs profile
The Wire: Adventures in Modern Music: Article Gallery of Max Eastley's work on The Wire magazine website

1944 births
Musicians from Torquay
Living people
British experimental musicians
Incus Records artists
Artists from Torquay